Events from the year 1154 in Ireland.

Incumbents
High King: Toirdelbach Ua Conchobair

Events
Abbeydorney Abbey, established by the Cistercian Order north of the modern village of Abbeydorney.

Births

Deaths

References